The second season of the Yu Yu Hakusho anime series, known as the Dark Tournament Saga, was directed Noriyuki Abe and produced by Fuji Television, Yomiko Advertising and Studio Pierrot. The episodes were released in North America by Funimation. Like the rest of the series, it adapts Yoshihiro Togashi's Yu Yu Hakusho manga from the sixth through the thirteenth volumes over forty-one episodes. The episodes cover the story of Yusuke Urameshi and how his tenure as Spirit Detective led him to participate in the "Dark Tournament," a competition between demons to determine the strongest supernatural inhabitants of the Living World.

The season initially ran from April 17, 1993, to January 29, 1994, in Japan on Fuji Television. The first twenty-eight episodes of the English adaptation of the anime were aired between April and May 2003 on Cartoon Network's Toonami programming block. Yu Yu Hakusho was then removed from Toonami's listings until January 2004, when re-runs of the old episodes were shown. New episodes began airing in May 2004, with the last episodes of the saga shown in July 2004.

Four pieces of theme music are used for the episodes; one opening theme and two closing themes.

Twelve DVD compilations, each containing either three or four episodes of the saga, have been released by Funimation. The first compilation was released on December 10, 2002 and the twelfth on December 9, 2003. Two DVD collection boxes, each containing six of the twelve compilations, have also been released by Funimation. The first was released on July 27, 2004, and the second on October 26, 2004. A Blu-ray compilation was released by Funimation on August 9, 2011.

Episodes list

References
General

Specific

External links
Studio Pierrot's YuYu Hakusho website 
Funimation's YuYu Hakusho website

1993 Japanese television seasons
1994 Japanese television seasons
Season 2